Geoffrey V may refer to:
Geoffrey Plantagenet, Count of Anjou (died 1151), also Geoffrey V of Anjou
Geoffrey V of Joinville (died 1204)
Geoffrey V, Viscount of Châteaudun (died 1218)